Cardiastethus assimilis is a species of minute pirate bug in the family Lyctocoridae. It is found in the Caribbean and North America.

References

Further reading

 

Lyctocoridae
Articles created by Qbugbot
Insects described in 1871